The Vista class is a class of cruise ships built by Fincantieri in Italy. The ships are operated by the Carnival Cruise Line, Costa Crociere, and Adora Cruises divisions of Carnival Corporation & plc.

The ship's design is based on the design of Carnival's Dream-class fleet of ships, but with a different stern and main atrium. The length was increased an additional 56-58 ft on the Vista-Class ships, compared to the Dream-class.

History 
 was constructed in the Fincantieri shipyard of Monfalcone (Gorizia) and was delivered in April 2016. The first steel for the ship was cut in late February 2014, and the keel was laid in October 2014. The Carnival Vista Coin Ceremony/Float out was done in June 2015, with the ship being delivered on April 28, 2016. Carnival Vista features outdoor spots like Havana Bar & Pool, a ropes course, mini golf, SkyRide at SportSquare (an -long track suspended around its top deck that passengers can circle in pedal-powered capsules), and Seafood Shack plus additional spaces like the first IMAX at sea. Carnival Vista has custom Cuban themed staterooms and new Family Harbor staterooms. The Clubhouse features indoor activities like mini-bowling and arcade-style basketball, soccer, volleyball, and table tennis. The ship also has SkyGreens, a mini golf course on Deck 12.

The second Vista-class ship, was delivered to Carnival in March 2018. Like Carnival Vista, Carnival Horizon features SkyRide, an IMAX Theatre, a Water Works aqua park which is themed after Dr. Seuss characters, and Carnival's Seuss at Sea programme. She also has some unique new attractions such as Bonsai Teppanyaki and Guy's Pig & Anchor Bar-B-Que Smokehouse/Brewhouse.

In 2019 and 2020 Fincantieri was expected to deliver one ship to P&O Cruises Australia and two ships for Costa Crociere, however on December 15, 2016 Carnival Corporation announced that the ship that was to set sail for P&O Cruises Australia in 2019 would now be sailing for Carnival Cruise Line. P&O was then set to receive a retrofitted  instead, however in September 2017, it was announced that Carnival Splendor would stay in the Carnival fleet and P&O Cruises Australia would get Princess Cruises  in 2020.

Two more future ships will be built at China State Shipbuilding Corporation and are due to be delivered from 2022 to CSSC Carnival Cruise Shipping. There are options for four more ships.

The third Vista-class ship, was announced on 1 December 2017. Unlike her Carnival sisters Carnival Vista and Carnival Horizon, Carnival Panorama replaced the IMAX theater with an indoor SkyZone trampoline park. She made her maiden voyage as the Carnival flagship on 11 December 2019 from her homeport in Long Beach, California. Vanna White serves as the ship's godmother.

In 2023 and 2024, Costa Venezia and Costa Firenze will join the Carnival Cruise Line fleet under a newly created joint concept with Costa Crociere named Costa by Carnival. Costa Venezia will homeport in New York City, New York in 2023 and Costa Firenze will homeport in Long Beach, California joining in 2024. In December 2022, Carnival announced that these two ships will be known as the Venice-class.

Ships

References

External links
 Carnival Cruise Lines

Cruise ship classes
Panamax cruise ships
Carnival Cruise Lines
Luminosa